Trail of Courage is a 1928 American silent Western film directed by Wallace Fox and starring Bob Steele, Marjorie Bonner, and Thomas G. Lingham.

Cast 
 Bob Steele as Tex Reeves
 Marjorie Bonner as Ruth Tobin
 Thomas G. Lingham as Jack Tobin
 Jay Morley as Chili Burns

References

External links 
 

1928 films
1928 Western (genre) films
Films directed by Wallace Fox
American black-and-white films
Film Booking Offices of America films
Silent American Western (genre) films
1920s English-language films
1920s American films